Zipit may refer to:

ZipIt, a Classic Mac OS PKZIP program
The Zipit wireless messenger (Z2) multi-protocol instant messenger system